Pseudomonnea is a genus of beetles in the family Carabidae, containing the following species:

 Pseudomonnea grandis Mateu, 1983
 Pseudomonnea maculata Mateu, 1983
 Pseudomonnea nigrescens Mateu, 1983

References

Lebiinae